River of Time is the fifth studio album released by RCA Nashville in 1989 by the American country music duo the Judds. It features the singles "Young Love (Strong Love)," "Let Me Tell You About Love," "One Man Woman" and "Guardian Angels." While the first two singles reached #1 on the country charts, the latter two peaked at #8 and #16 respectively, with "Guardian Angels" being their first single since 1983's "Had a Dream (For the Heart)" to miss Top Ten. "Do I Dare" is not included on the cassette or vinyl versions.

Critical reception

Billboard reviewed the album in the April 15, 1989 issue. The review said, "Although this album has fewer memorable songs than the stunning Heartland, it is still a pure sonic feast. Wynonna Judd's straining-at-the-leash lead vocals perfectly counterpoint the sparkling minimalist instrumentation, and there is a full range of styles–from the breezy jazziness of "Not My Baby" to the canonical country of "Guardian Angels". Among the song contributors are Mark Knopfler, Felice & Boudleaux Bryant, Carl Perkins, Don Schlitz, the ever-present Paul Kenenrley, and Naomi Judd."

Cashbox also published review in their April 15, 1989 issue which said, "Wynonna and Naomi present possibly their last album for Curb/RCA with all the style and flair inherent in their usual recorded efforts. Wynonna shows an even greater depth of vocal delivery here, especially on tunes like “One Woman Man” and "Cadillac Red" (which was co- written by Naomi with J. Jarvis and Craig Bickhardt). Naomi also co-wrote two other tunes ("River of Time" and "Guardian AngelS"), both of which display the emergence of a talented songwriter. Now at number 11 on the top 100 with "Young Love", the Judds should continue their charting sweep with several other hot tunes. Best cut overall would have to be the Mark Knopfler-penned "Water of Love”, a soul-wrencher with stellar guitar accompaniment."

Track listing

Personnel
As listed in liner notes.

The Judds
 Naomi Judd – vocals
 Wynonna Judd – vocals

Additional musicians
 Eddie Bayers – drums
 Mark Casstevens – acoustic guitar 
 Quitman Dennis – clarinet
 Sonny Garrish – pedal steel guitar, dobro
 Roy Huskey, Jr. – upright bass on "Let Me Tell You About Love"
 John Barlow Jarvis – piano
 Kirk "Jelly Roll" Johnson – harmonica
 Mark Knopfler – electric guitar on "Water of Love"
 Farrell Morris – percussion
 Craig Nelson – string bass on "Sleepless Nights"
 Bobby Ogdin – piano, Hammond B-3 organ
 Carl Perkins – electric guitar on "Let Me Tell You About Love"
 Don Potter – acoustic guitar, electric guitar on "Sleepless Nights"
 Jack Williams - bass guitar

Charts

Weekly charts

Year-end charts

Certifications

References

1989 albums
Curb Records albums
The Judds albums
RCA Records albums
Albums produced by Brent Maher